Black Mountain is an alpine ski area located in Jackson, New Hampshire, United States. It offers terrain for all abilities, including slopes for novices, cruising trails for intermediates, and black diamond trails for experts. The terrain is served by two chairlifts and three surface lifts.

In addition to alpine skiing and snowboarding, Black Mountain also offers summer camps and equine programs.

History 
The Civilian Conservation Corps cut the first ski trail on the mountain in 1934, making Black Mountain one of the oldest ski areas in New Hampshire. The Goodrich Falls Hydroelectric Plant was constructed in 1935 on the Ellis River to power the resort's lift and lodge. The power plant was built by Edwin Moody, owner of the ski area (then known as Moody's). Moody and local inventor George Morton constructed one of the first ski lifts in New Hampshire and used the plant to power the lift and lodge.

References

External links 
 Black Mountain - Official site

Buildings and structures in Carroll County, New Hampshire
Ski areas and resorts in New Hampshire
Tourist attractions in Carroll County, New Hampshire